The 1892 North Carolina gubernatorial election was held on November 8, 1892. Democratic nominee Elias Carr defeated Republican nominee David M. Furches with 48.3% of the vote. Harry Skinner unsuccessfully ran for the Populist nomination.

Democratic convention
The Democratic convention was held on May 18, 1892.

Candidates 
Elias Carr, President of the North Carolina Farmer's Association
Thomas Michael Holt, incumbent Governor
George W. Sanderlin, Auditor of North Carolina
Julian Carr, businessman
Sydenham Benoni Alexander, U.S. Representative
Thomas Jordan Jarvis, former Governor

Results
The results of the balloting were as follows:

General election

Candidates
Major party candidates
Elias Carr, Democratic
David M. Furches, Republican

Other candidates
Wyatt P. Exum, People's
James M. Templeton, Prohibition

Results

References

1892
North Carolina
Gubernatorial